Urak Lawoi’ or Urak Lawoc (Urak Lawoi':) is a Malayic language spoken in southern Thailand.

The Orang (Suku) Laut who live between Sumatra and the Malay Peninsula speak divergent Malayic lects, which bear some intriguing connections to various Sumatran Malay varieties.

Phonology and orthography

Vowels

 In closed syllables, some vowels change their quality:
  becomes  (  'space').
  becomes  (  'return').
  becomes  (  'stomach').
 Vowels are somewhat lengthened in stressed open syllables allophonically.

Notes: In the Thai script, the left column represents diacritics for open syllables, while the right one for closed syllables. For syllables with vowel ö, before consonants k, m, n, ng, p, and t, the vowel is not reflected. Similarly, the diacritic for a is not used before q. Any vowels with separate closed syllable diacritics have inherent value of  when not used with succeeding consonant.

Consonants 

  and  allophones are influenced by Thai, whereas  is influenced by Malay.
 Aspirated consonants and  only appear in loanwords (that are mostly from Thai).
  becomes  after , otherwise  in syllable-final positions (  'space' vs.   'doctor').
  is compensatorily lengthened to phonetically long .
 The coda stop  after a front vowel becomes  (  'sheep').

  and  could be treated as a part of diphthongs or triphthongs.
  only exists in Phuket dialect.

Stress and Intonation 
Urak Lawoi' does not have tones, except in Thai loans. Words are usually stressed in penultimate syllable, except if it the expected stress is placed in pre-syllable (e.g. open syllables containing , but not ) the stress moves into the next syllable. Urak Lawoi' also has the intonation for the whole sentence. For example, the interrogative sentences have raising intonation, and the negative sentences have lower-pitch intonation.

References

Further reading

 
 
 
 
 ศูนย์ศึกษาและฟื้นฟูภาษาและวัฒนธรรมในภาวะวิกฤต. (2020). คู่มือระบบเขียนภาษาอูรักลาโวยจอักษรไทย ฉบับมหาวิทยาลัยมหิดล. นครปฐม: สถาบันวิจัยภาษาและวัฒนธรรมเอเชีย มหาวิทยาลัยมหิดล. 

Malayic languages
Languages of Thailand